The false gharial (Tomistoma schlegelii), also known by the names Malayan gharial, Sunda gharial and tomistoma is a freshwater crocodilian of the family Gavialidae native to Peninsular Malaysia, Borneo, Sumatra and Java. It is listed as Vulnerable on the IUCN Red List, as the global population is estimated at around 2,500 to 10,000 mature individuals.

The specific name schlegelii honors Hermann Schlegel.

Taxonomy
The scientific name Crocodilus (Gavialis) schlegelii was proposed by Salomon Müller in 1838 who described a specimen collected in Borneo. In 1846, he proposed to use the name Tomistoma schlegelii, if it needs to be placed in a distinct genus.

The genus Tomistoma potentially also contains several extinct species like T. cairense, T. lusitanicum, T. taiwanicus, and T. coppensi. However, these species may need to be reclassified to different genera as evidence suggests they may be paraphyletic.

The false gharial's snout broadens considerably towards the base and so is more similar to those of true crocodiles than to the gharial (Gavialis gangeticus), whose osteology indicated a distinct lineage from all other living crocodilians. However, although more morphologically similar to Crocodylidae based on skeletal features, recent molecular studies using DNA sequencing consistently indicate that the false gharial and by inference other related extinct forms traditionally viewed as belonging to the crocodylian subfamily Tomistominae actually belong to Gavialoidea and Gavialidae.

Fossils of extinct Tomistoma species have been found in deposits of Paleogene, Neogene, and Quaternary ages in Taiwan, Uganda, Italy, Portugal, Egypt and India, but nearly all of them are likely to be distinct genera due to older age compared to the false gharial.

The below cladogram of the major living crocodile groups is based on molecular studies and shows the false gharial's close relationships:

The following cladogram shows the false gharial's placement within the Gavialidae; it is based on a tip dating study, for which morphological, DNA sequencing and stratigraphic data were analysed:

Characteristics

The false gharial is dark reddish-brown above with dark brown or black spots and cross-bands on the back and tail. Ventrals are grayish-white, with some lateral dark mottling. Juveniles are mottled with black on the sides of the jaws, body, and tail. The smooth and unornamented snout is extremely long and slender, parallel sided, with a length of 3.0 to 3.5 times the width at the base. All teeth are long and needle-like, interlocking on the insides of the jaws, and are individually socketed. The dorsal scales are broad at midbody and extend onto the sides of the body. The digits are webbed at the base. Integumentary sensory organs are present on the head and body scalation. Scales behind the head are frequently a slightly enlarged single pair. Some individuals bear a number of adjoining small keeled scales. Scalation is divided medially by soft granular skin. Three transverse rows of two enlarged nuchal scales are continuous with the dorsal scales, which consist of 22 transverse rows of six to eight scales, are broad at midbody and extend onto the sides of the body. Nuchal and dorsal rows equals a total of 22 to 23 rows. It has 18 double-crested caudal whorls and 17 single-crested caudal whorls. The flanks have one or two longitudinal rows of six to eight very enlarged scales on each side.

The false gharial has one of the slimmest snouts of any living crocodilian, comparable to that of the slender-snouted crocodile and the freshwater crocodile in slenderness; only that of the gharial is noticeably slimmer. The false gharial apparently has the largest skull of any extant crocodilian, in part because of the great length of the slender snout. Out of the eight longest crocodilian skulls from existing species that could be found in museums around the world, six of these belonged to false gharials.
 

Distribution and habitat
False gharials are native to Peninsular Malaysia, Sarawak, and Indonesia (Sumatra, and Borneo), but were extirpated in Singapore, Vietnam, and Thailand. It is unclear if they remain in Java. Apart from rivers, they inhabit swamps and lakes. The species is almost entirely found today in peat swamps and lowland swamp forests. In the 1990s, information and sightings were available from 39 localities in 10 different river drainages, along with the remote river systems of Borneo.

Prior to the 1950s, Tomistoma occurred in freshwater ecosystems along the entire length of Sumatra east of the Barisan Mountains. The current distribution in eastern Sumatra has been reduced by 30-40% due to hunting, logging, fires, and agriculture.

Ecology and behaviour

Diet
Until recently, very little was known about the diet or behaviour of the false gharial in the wild. Details are slowly being revealed. In the past, the false gharial was thought to have a diet of only fish and very small vertebrates, but more recent evidence indicates that it has a generalist diet despite its narrow snout. In addition to fish and smaller aquatic animals, mature adults prey on larger vertebrates, including proboscis monkeys, long-tailed macaques, deer, water birds, and reptiles. There is an eyewitness account of a false gharial attacking a cow in East Kalimantan.

The false gharial may be considered an ecological equivalent to Neotropical crocodiles such as the Orinoco and American crocodiles, which both have slender snouts but a broad diet.

Reproduction
False gharials are mound-nesters. Females lay small clutches of 13 to 35 eggs per nest, and appear to produce the largest eggs of extant crocodilians.

It is not known when they breed in the wild or when the nesting season is. Once the eggs are laid, and construction of the mound is completed, the female abandons her nest. Unlike most other crocodilians, the young receive no parental care and are at risk of being eaten by predators, such as mongooses, tigers, leopards, and wild dogs. The young hatch after 90 days and are left to fend for themselves.

Conflict
In 2008, a 4-m female false gharial attacked and ate a fisherman in central Kalimantan; his remains were found in the gharial's stomach. This was the first verified fatal human attack by a false gharial. However, by 2012, at least two more verified fatal attacks on humans by false gharials had occurred indicating perhaps an increase of human-false gharial conflict possibly correlated to the decline of habitat, habitat quality, and natural prey numbers.

Threats
The false gharial is threatened with extinction throughout most of its range due to the drainage of its freshwater swamplands and clearance of surrounding rainforests. The species is also hunted frequently for its skin and meat, and the eggs are often harvested for human consumption.

Conservation
The false gharial is listed on CITES Appendix I. Currently population surveys indicate that while the false gharial is not for the most extirpated from areas it used to inhabit, the distribution of individuals is much more spotty than the previously more connective distribution, putting the animals at risk of genetic isolation. In large part, the isolation of false gharials is due to extremely extensive habitat destruction and disturbance within the species' area of distribution, few areas outside of legally protected areas are likely to bear viable breeding populations.

Steps have been taken by the Malaysian and Indonesian governments to prevent its extinction in the wild. There are reports of some populations rebounding in Indonesia, yet with this slight recovery, mostly irrational fears of attacks have surfaced amongst the local human population. Yayasan Ulin (The Ironwood Foundation) is currently attempting to manage a wetland area in East Kalimantan, which is known to contain the false gharials.

References

External links

 Crocodile Specialist Group:   
 Tomistoma Task Force
 Saint Louis Zoo: False gharial
 ARKive Images 
 BBC News: 'Match-making' for rare male croc
 The Orangutan Foundation research centre being used for critical research on false gharials

Gavialidae
Reptiles of Malaysia
Reptiles of Indonesia
Reptiles of Borneo
Reptiles described in 1838
Apex predators
Crocodilians of Asia